Perumbidugu Mutharaiyar (705 AD-745 AD), also known as Suvaran Maran and Perarasar Perumbidugu Mutharaiyar he belonged to Muthuraja community.He was a king of Thanjavur. He ruled over Thanjavur, Trichy, Pudukkottai, Perambalur and Thiruvarur as a feudatory of the Pallava dynasty. He attended the coronation of Nandivarman II.

Life 

Perumbidugu Mutharaiyar II was born on 23 May 675 AD. His father was Elangovathiaraiyan, alias Maran Parameshwaran. He ascended the throne after his father in 705 AD. He was succeeded by his son Sathan Maran.

The historian T. V. Mahalingam believed it possible that the reference to a person called Kataka Muttaraiyar in ancient inscriptions at the Vaikuntha Perumal temple may in fact refer to Perumbidugu Mutharaiyar. He fought in at least 12 battles against the forces of the Pandya and Chera dynasties, allying himself with Nandivarman.

The anniversary of Mutharaiyar's birth is celebrated annually all the people and local politicians. They garland a statue commemorating him in Trichy.

References 

Pallava dynasty
People from Thanjavur
705 births
745 deaths